Shulani i Radomirës is a mountain in Albania. It is connected to Mount Korab by a long ridge. Shulani i Radomirës gets its name from the village of Radomirë which is located in the western slopes of Mount Korab. Shulani i Radomirës is the last peak of a long ridge in Albania which contains two other peaks going over  other than Mount Korab and Shulani i Radomirës.

References

Mountains of Albania